Gabi Luncă (16 October 1938 – 2 April 2021) was a Romanian-Romani  lăutar musician. Born in Vărbilău, Prahova County, Romania, she was also a folk singer.

Life
Her father was also part of the lăutari, a very respected violinist because he was a "notist" (he knew how to read music). Her mother died when she was very young and this left a major impression on her life; many of her songs deal with the "mother" theme.

She was a favorite of Romania's communist ruler Nicolae Ceaușescu and his wife Elena.

In the later part of her life, Gabi Luncă converted to Pentecostalism and started singing exclusively religious music.

She was married to the great accordionist Ion Stan-Onoriu.

Gabi Luncă died of COVID-19 in Bucharest, at the age of 82.

References

 Jurnalul Național - Gabi Luncă collection edition - April 16, 2007
 Jurnalul Național - Gabi Luncă collection edition - June 23, 2008
 Biography

External links
 Video recording from the archives of the television - Gabi Lunca singing "My mother is a florist"
 

1938 births
2021 deaths
People from Prahova County
Romanian folk singers
Lăutari and lăutărească music
Romanian Pentecostals
20th-century Romanian women singers
20th-century Romanian singers
21st-century Romanian women singers
21st-century Romanian singers
Deaths from the COVID-19 pandemic in Romania
Romanian Romani people
Romani singers